Phiomia is an extinct genus of basal proboscid that lived in what is now Northern Africa during the Late Eocene to Early Oligocene some 37–30 million years ago. "Phiomia serridens" means "saw-toothed animal of Faiyum".

Description 
Phiomia serridens (=P. wintoni, P. osborni, P. minor) is estimated to had shoulder height , while P. major got larger size. It vaguely resembled a modern elephant, although, based on the shape of its nasal bones, it had only a very short trunk. It had short tusks on the upper jaw and also short shovel-like tusks on the lower jaw that were most likely used for gathering food. These were similar to those of the Miocene Platybelodon, Archaeobelodon, and Amebelodon, but considerably smaller. The tusks in the upper jaw may have been used in defence, or scraping bark off trees.

References

Elephantiformes
Prehistoric placental genera
Eocene mammals of Africa
Oligocene mammals of Africa
Eocene proboscideans
Oligocene proboscideans
Priabonian genus first appearances
Rupelian genus extinctions
Fossil taxa described in 1902